Antipolo station is an elevated Manila Light Rail Transit (LRT) station situated on Line 2. Located in Antipolo, Rizal, is the eastern terminus of the line. It opened on July 5, 2021 and is the line's easternmost station, located on the stretch of Marikina–Infanta Highway near the intersection of Sumulong Highway. It is the first Manila LRT System station outside Metro Manila to be operational.

History

Antipolo station was constructed as part of the Line 2 East Extension, which called for a  extension eastward from Santolan station and the construction of two stations.

Construction of the Line 2 east extension began in September 2015 while the construction of Antipolo and Marikina stations began in May 2017. The expected opening was supposed to be in the fourth quarter of 2020, but was postponed repeatedly due to the COVID-19 pandemic and various circumstances in integrating the east extension to the line's existing systems. Earlier, the station was called Masinag Station, however, it was renamed in early 2021 for its location in Antipolo.

The east extension was inaugurated on July 1, 2021 by President Rodrigo Duterte, and Antipolo station opened on July 5, 2021. Rides for the East Extension were free of charge until July 18, 2021. Due to the location's elevation for a possible future extension to Cogeo, the height between the ground and concourse levels is equivalent to three levels. As such, the end of the line after the switching tracks has provisions for a continuation.

Nearby landmarks
The station is connected to SM City Masinag and East Gate Business Center and Terminal Center via walkway which is terminal for buses, e-jeeps and tricycles bound for Padilla-Paenaan and city proper of Antipolo. Other adjacent landmarks include the Diocesan Shrine and Parish of St. Therese of the Child Jesus, Cornel Medical Center, and Metro Antipolo Hospital and Medical Center. Residential subdivisions such as Kingsville Executive Village, Vermont Park Executive Village, Golden Meadows Executive Village, and Filinvest East Homes are found in the vicinity of the station.

References

Manila Light Rail Transit System stations
Railway stations opened in 2021